Rum Tum Tugger is one of the many feline characters in the 1939 poetry book Old Possum's Book of Practical Cats by T. S. Eliot, and in the 1981 musical Cats which is based on Eliot's book. Rum Tum Tugger is a rebellious Jellicle cat who loves to be the center of attention.

The role of Rum Tum Tugger was originated by Paul Nicholas on the West End in 1981, and by Terrence Mann on Broadway in 1982. Then, in the 1998 video production, he was performed by John Partridge. Jason Derulo portrayed Rum Tum Tugger in the 2019 film adaptation.

Origins
In T. S. Eliot's Old Possum's Book of Practical Cats, Rum Tum Tugger is described as a rebel cat who cannot help but be difficult. He is never satisfied with what you give him;
The Rum Tum Tugger is a Curious Cat:
If you offer him pheasant he would rather have grouse.
If you put him in a house he would much prefer a flat,
If you put him in a flat then he'd rather have a house.
If you set him on a mouse then he only wants a rat,
If you set him on a rat then he'd rather chase a mouse.

He is notoriously hard to please and sets himself apart from others by trying to be different. He always does the opposite of what is expected of him and by the end of the poem the reader is left with the idea that the Rum Tum Tugger is deviously self-centered and relishes in being so. The three words that are used to describe his character given to each performer who plays the role are "perverse, preening, and independent".

Musical

Character
Rum Tum Tugger is a rebellious and unappeasable cat. He loves the limelight, while at the same time enjoys being seen as an individual by separating himself a little from the tribe. A ladies' man, the female kittens (Victoria, Etcetera, Electra and Jemima) are in awe of him, and he flirts openly with almost every female cat in the 1998 film adaptation (especially Bombalurina), although Demeter seems to dislike him deeply. He also admires Mr. Mistoffelees, even going so far as to sing a ballad about how talented he is. His older brother, the serious and responsible Munkustrap, often has to keep him in line.

Rum Tum Tugger is often portrayed as a rock star-esque cat, and Andrew Lloyd Webber has stated that part of the character is intended to be an homage to Mick Jagger of The Rolling Stones. In an attempt to modernize the show, Rum Tum Tugger was revamped into a street rapper in the 2014 West End revival.

The role is usually played by a rock tenor with a strong falsetto register.

As a major character part, Tugger is a principal singing role with several solos. He sings solo in his own song, "The Rum Tum Tugger", as well as "Magical Mr. Mistoffelees". He sings "Old Deuteronomy" with Munkustrap.

Appearance
Rum Tum Tugger is a black tom cat with leopard spots on his chest and a wild mane; he wears a spiked collar and a belt covered with silver rhinestones. His cat breed was said to be Maine Coon, because of his wild mane and being portrayed as being much bigger than the other cats.

Notable casting
The role of Rum Tum Tugger was originated by Paul Nicholas in the West End in 1981, and by Terrence Mann on Broadway in 1982. The character was played by Antoine Murray-Straughan and Marcquelle Ward in the 2014 and 2015 West End revivals respectively, and by Tyler Hanes in the 2016 Broadway revival.

On screen, he was played by John Partridge in the 1998 film adaptation, and by Jason Derulo in the 2019 film adaptation.

References

Print sources

 

Characters in Cats (musical)
Literary characters introduced in 1939

ja:ラム・タム・タガー